Bertha Nicoline Tuxen (14 November 1847 – 5 April 1931) was a Danish painter of still lifes, flowers, and portraits.

Life
Nicoline Tuxen was a daughter of the naval officer and director of the Orlogsværftet Nicolai Elias Tuxen (1810-1891) and his wife Bertha Laura Giødvad (1815-1908). Her younger brother was the sculptor and painter Laurits Tuxen. Since women were not allowed to study at the Royal Danish Academy of Fine Arts before 1888, she took lessons with Vilhelm Kyhn at his private drawing school for women (Tegneskolen for Kvinder), which existed between 1865 and 1895. Several study trips led her later to Paris. In 1891 she was awarded the Neuhausen Prize (De Neuhausenske Præmier) and in 1893 with a scholarship from the Royal Academy.

Nicoline Tuxen was regularly represented at the prestigious Charlottenborg Spring Exhibition (Forårsudstilling) in Copenhagen from the middle of the 1880s. Further exhibitions with her participation were, for example, the Palace of Fine Arts at the 1893 World's Columbian Exposition in Chicago, Illinois., an exhibition in Antwerp 1894 and the "Nordische Kunstausstellung" Lübeck 1895. She mainly painted flower pictures and still life, in later years also portraits. Their works bear the unmistakable stamp of the Danish Golden Age of painting.

Nicoline Tuxen remained unmarried, she died in Frederiksberg at the age of 83 and was buried at the Holmens Cemetery in Copenhagen.

Gallery

References

Further reading
 
 
 Tuxen, Nicoline. In: Kunstindeks Danmark & Weilbachs Kunstnerleksikon (in Danish)

External links

 Paintings from Nicoline Tuxen at Artnet
 Genealogy of the Tuxen family (II-K-7-a-1-e)
 Malerier og Studier af Frk. Nicoline Tuxen - udstillede i O.V. Lemmings Lokaler, Bredgade Nr. 28, Fra 17. Februar 1897 til 17. Marts 1897, Katalog (in Danish)

1847 births
1931 deaths
Artists from Copenhagen
19th-century Danish painters
20th-century Danish painters
19th-century Danish women artists
20th-century Danish women artists
20th-century Danish artists
Tuxen family